"Ice Cream of Margie (with the Light Blue Hair)" is the seventh episode of the eighteenth season of the American animated television series The Simpsons. It originally aired on the Fox network in the United States on November 26, 2006. In the episode, Homer gets fired from the nuclear power plant yet again and takes over an ice cream truck business, while a depressed Marge creates Popsicle-stick sculptures to keep busy. The sculptures quickly become popular, and Marge is excited to have a purpose in life until a turn of events divides the Simpsons household. It was written by Carolyn Omine, and directed by Matthew Nastuk. In its original run, the episode received 10.90 million viewers.

Plot
During a chair hockey game at the power plant with office supplies, Mr. Burns chastises Homer for behaving unprofessionally during the game. Homer gets in more trouble when an ice cream truck passes by the plant, causing him to fantasize that Mr. Burns is an ice cream cone and try to lick him, resulting in Homer being fired as he runs towards the ice cream truck. Homer uses a $100 bill to buy a 25 cent ice cream from the ice cream man, Max, who collapses and dies of a fatal heart attack while changing the bill into coins. Max's widow sells the truck to Homer, and Homer has Otto remodel it à la Pimp My Ride. Meanwhile, the television series Opal — Springfield's version of The Oprah Winfrey Show — has a show about successful women, which sends Marge into a deep depression, as she feels she has not done anything memorable with her life. Marge is inspired by all the Popsicle sticks Homer brings home, and makes sculptures out of them.

Kent Brockman sees the sculptures and interviews Marge, who says she creates them, so they will serve as a reminder of her when she is gone. Kent includes her on a news special, Kent Brockman's Kentresting People. Thanks to the publicity, Rich Texan creates an art show to showcase Marge's talent; however, it opens on Saturday, a day with high ice cream sales. Homer promises to return by 3 o'clock to see the art show. He loses track of time and hurries home, but accidentally crashes into his own lawn in the process, destroying all of Marge's sculptures. Marge says that Homer has ruined her dreams and locks herself in the bedroom.

Several days later, Homer tries to express how bad he feels by slipping pictures of himself under the door, but falls asleep. When he wakes up, Marge is gone and Grandpa is looking after Bart and Lisa, who tell him that Marge left hours ago. Marge is on top of city hall, where she declares she will show the world how she feels about Homer. She reveals the largest Popsicle sculpture she has ever made, and the subject is Homer. Marge realizes that Homer tried to keep his promise to her and make it on time, not that he did not care, much to the shock of a nearby Opal. Marge apologizes to Homer for the way that she acted, Homer apologizes for ruining her sculptures, and the two reunite. The scene shifts 200 years into the future, where the Homer sculpture is the only remaining element of Western art in a world where iPods have conquered humanity, whipping them with headphones for a hobby.

Cultural references

This episode's title is a reference to the first words of Stephen Foster's "Jeanie with the Light Brown Hair", lyrics that also inspired the title of the sitcom I Dream of Jeannie.
Greta Wolfcastle makes a non-speaking cameo appearance in this episode.
The episode features the songs "Get Ur Freak On" by Missy Elliott, "Money for Nothing" by Dire Straits, "Feels So Good" by Chuck Mangione, and varied scorings of "Pop Goes the Weasel".
The revelation of the customized ice cream truck is a parody of Pimp My Ride, which also had an episode about a man with a broken-down ice cream truck that gets pimped out by Xzibit. Bart says: "Wow Otto, you totally pimped Dad's ride."
The scene where Homer gets dressed in his ice cream man uniform is a reference to the opening of Da Ali G Show. 
The TV show Marge watches, Opal, is a parody of The Oprah Winfrey Show. Opal reappears in "Husbands and Knives" and "Funeral for a Fiend".
When Homer is speeding to Marge's art show, the theme from the 1970s TV show The Streets of San Francisco is heard.
Homer mistakes a huge Popsicle-stick sculpture of himself for Magilla Gorilla. 
The episode predicts a bleak future in which humanity is enslaved by anthropomorphic giant iPods.
 When Snake Jailbird hijacks the helicopter, he tells Kent Brockman about a "tie-up on the 101/405 interchange". The interchange between the 101 and 405 Freeways is actually in Sherman Oaks, California.
 This episode is referenced in "The Simpsons: Tapped Out" with the availability of popsicle stick Patty, Selma, and Disco Stu decorations introduced in Level 35.

Reception
Dan Iverson of IGN deemed the entire episode boring and said it had no general quality to make it interesting. He enjoyed Carl Carlson's line to Lenny Leonard: "See, statements like that are why people think we're gay." He also appreciated the Ali G parody. He gave the episode a final rating of 5.2/10. Adam Finley of TV Squad gave the episode a negative review, and said that it was boring.

References

External links
 

The Simpsons (season 18) episodes
2006 American television episodes
Television episodes about termination of employment
Ice cream vans
Television episodes written by Carolyn Omine